Do Not Erase is a 2006 short film written and directed by Asitha Ameresekere.  Do Not Erase won Best Short Film at the 60th British Academy Film Awards (BAFTA).

Plot
Annie sends video diaries to her 19-year-old son who is stationed in Iraq under British Forces. It isn't long before the video becomes more than just a diary. Set against the backdrop of the current Iraqi conflict, the film explores its impact on an ordinary family in the north of England.

Cast
 Jeanette Rourke – Annie
 Peter Andrew – Frank
 Sasha Hermann – Sharona

Awards
60th British Academy Film Awards (BAFTA)
 Won: Best Short Film

22nd Hamburg International Short Film Festival
 Won: Audience Award Winner

15th Augsburg Film Festival
 Won: Audience Award Winner

short cuts Cologne no.9
 Won: Jury Award & Audience Award Winner

External links 

Do Not Erase at KurzFilmAgentur Hamburg
BBC News Article
Sunday Times Article
Daily Mirror News Article

2006 films
British short films
2000s English-language films